General elections were held in Dominica on 8 December 2014 to elect the 21 members of the House of Assembly. Prime Minister Roosevelt Skerrit announced the election date on 5 November 2014 and Nomination Day was held on 19 November. Under Dominica's electoral system, the Prime Minister has the authority to call elections at any time and is only required to give a minimum of twenty-five days' notice.

The ruling social democratic Dominica Labour Party lost three seats but retained a commanding majority, with 15 of the 21 seats in Parliament. The remaining six seats were won by the centre-right United Workers' Party, which has remained the sole opposition party in Parliament since the 2005 election.

Electoral system
The 21 elected members of the House of Assembly were elected in single-member constituencies. A further nine members were appointed by the President, five on the advice of the Prime Minister and four on the advice of the Leader of the Opposition.

Campaign
Forty-four candidates contested the twenty-one constituencies; the two dominant parties (Dominica Labour Party and United Workers' Party) ran candidates in each constituency, whilst two independent candidates also participated in the elections.

Results
The opposition gained three seats, winning all three constituencies in the capital Roseau, and three constituencies in a rural belt across the lower part of northern Dominica.

References

Elections in Dominica
Dominica
2014 in Dominica
December 2014 events in North America